The 1961 Armstrong 500 was an endurance motor race for standard production sedans. The event was held at the Phillip Island circuit in Victoria, Australia on 19 November 1961 over 167 laps of the 3.0 mile circuit, a total of 501 miles (807 km). The race was organised by the Light Car Club of Australia and was sponsored by Armstrong York Engineering Pty Ltd.

It was the second event held in the combined history of the Bathurst 1000, which had begun the previous year with the first Armstrong 500. Interest had waned since the previous year with the entry for this year the lowest in the races history until the fields were restricted to V8 Supercars only in 1995.

Geoff Russell and David Anderson backed up their 1960 class victory in their Peugeot 403 by winning their class again. Bob Jane and Harry Firth were the only combination to complete the full race distance, earning the pair the first of their four outright race wins, although the concept of outright race win would not be officially recognised until 1965. Mercedes-Benz, Studebaker and Renault all took their first class wins.

Class structure

Class A
Class A was for cars with an engine capacity over 2600cc. The class featured Ford Customline, Studebaker Lark and Vauxhall Velox.

Class B
Class B was for cars with an engine capacity between 1601cc and 2600cc. The class featured Ford Falcon, Holden EK and Mercedes-Benz 220SE.

Class C
Class C was for cars with an engine capacity of between 1001cc and 1600cc. The class featured Morris Major, Peugeot 403, Simca Montlhery and Volkswagen 1200.

Class D
Class D was for cars with an engine capacity of 1000cc or less. The class featured Ford Anglia, Morris 850, Renault Gordini and Triumph Herald.

Results

Note: There was no outright winner, with only the winners of the four classes being given official recognition and prize money. However the Mercedes-Benz 220SE driven by Bob Jane and Harry Firth was the only car to complete the full 500-mile distance and it is generally considered to be the "winner" of the race.

Statistics
 Fastest Lap - #32 Jane/Firth - 2:41 - Laps 14 & 121
 Race Time - 8:00:31

References

Australia's Greatest Motor Race, 1960–1989, The First 30 Years
The Australian Racing History of Ford, © 1989
The First 15 Years (Hardie-Ferodo 1000, A Pictorial History 1960–1975)
 
The Age, Monday, 20 November 1961, Page 17

External links
 Race results, www.uniquecarsandparts.com.au
 1961 Armstrong 500 images, autopics.com.au

Armstrong 500
Armstrong 500
Motorsport at Phillip Island